The 1976 Kentucky Wildcats football team represented the University of Kentucky in the 1976 NCAA Division I football season. The Wildcats beat four different ranked teams during the season, scoring 209 points while allowing 151 points.  Kentucky won the 1976 Peach Bowl and finished the season 8–4 and ranked #19 in the country.

Season

Kentucky opened the season with a 38–13 victory over Oregon State.  Next was a 16–37 loss at Kansas.  The following week, Kentucky defeated West Virginia 14–10.

On October 10, Kentucky hosted #20 ranked Penn State.  The 57,733 in attendance was the largest crowd ever for a football game in the state of Kentucky up to that time.  Kentucky quarterback Derrick Ramsey ran for 95 yards and a touchdown; running back Chris Hill added 106 yards and a touchdown, and safety Rick Hayden had two interceptions.  Kentucky held Penn State to 212 yards of total offense and won 22–6.  Penn State coach Joe Paterno commented after the game, "That was a good football team we played. What can you say after you get the devil kicked out of you?"

That victory was followed by a 7-14 loss at Mississippi State, a team that would finish the season with a 9–2 record.  The following week, Kentucky defeated LSU 21–7.  A 7-31 loss to Georgia was next, followed by a 14–24 loss at Maryland.

Kentucky went undefeated in November, defeating Vanderbilt 14-0 and Florida 28–9, and beating Tennessee 7–0 in Knoxville.

Kentucky finished the season in the 1976 Peach Bowl against 9-2 North Carolina,  ranked #18.  Kentucky outgained North Carolina 334 yards to 109; the Wildcat defense held the Tar Heels to a total of five first downs and the Wildcats forced five turnovers.  Kentucky won 21-0 and ended the season ranked #19 in the AP poll.

Schedule

Team players in the 1977 NFL Draft

References

Kentucky
Kentucky Wildcats football seasons
Peach Bowl champion seasons
Kentucky Wildcats football